Neviglie is a comune (municipality) in the Province of Cuneo in the Italian region Piedmont, located about  southeast of Turin and about  northeast of Cuneo.

Neviglie borders the following municipalities: Mango, Neive, Treiso, and Trezzo Tinella.

Demographic evolution

References

Cities and towns in Piedmont